Leo Records is a British record company and label which releases jazz from Russian, American, and British musicians. It concentrates on free jazz.

Leo Records was founded in 1979 by Leo Feigin (also known under his broadcasting name Aleksei Leonidov), a Russian immigrant to Britain. The label was particularly associated with establishing the world reputation of the Ganelin Trio during the 1970s and 1980s.

It is generally associated with more experimental releases. The label has a close relationship with the artists who release material on the label; it does not sign artists to contracts, but releases their material on a single-album basis. By 2010 there were over 700 titles in Leo Records catalogue. Leo Records comprises four labels: Leo Records, Leo Lab (Leo Records Laboratory), Golden Years of New Jazz, and FeetFirst records.

This label is different from the Leo Records that was formed by Edward Vesala in Helsinki, Finland, in 1978.

Artists

Aardvark Jazz Orchestra
Art Ensemble of Chicago
Anthony Braxton
Arcady Kirichenko
John Wolf Brennan
Jaki Byard
Vladimir Chekassin
Eugenio Colombo
Marilyn Crispell
Carlo Actis Dato
Patrick Defossez
Joe Fonda
Satoko Fujii
Vyacheslav Ganelin/Ganelin Trio
Joachim Gies
Katsuyuki Itakura
Italian Instabile Orchestra
Hans Kumpf
Sergey Kuryokhin
Joëlle Léandre
Pago Libre
Misha Lobko
Keshavan Maslak
Phil Minton
Amina Claudine Myers
Joe Morris
Don Moye
Simon Nabatov
Sainkho Namtchylak
Mark Nauseef
Maggie Nicols
Evan Parker
Ivo Perelman
Umberto Petrin
Valentina Ponomaryova
Sun Ra
The Remote Viewers
Ned Rothenberg
Wadada Leo Smith
Miroslav Tadić
Aki Takase
Cecil Taylor
Gebhard Ullmann
Matthew Welch
Reggie Workman
Vlady Bystrov

References

Further reading
 Leo Feigin. all that jazz Sankt Petersburg: АМФОРА, 2009

External links

Leo Records website

British record labels
British jazz record labels
Jazz record labels